Jamindarru is a 2002 Indian Kannada-language action drama film starring Vishnuvardhan in dual roles, Prema and Raasi. The film is directed and written by S. Narayan and produced by K. Manju under Lakshmishree Combines. The film, upon release, met with positive reviews. The music was scored by M. M. Keeravani and Sax Raju.

StarCast
Vishnuvardhan as Bettappa, elder brother and Biligiri, little brother 
Prema
Raasi
Anu Prabhakar
Srinivasa Murthy
Hema Choudhary
Shivaram
Sundar Raj
Doddanna
Mukhyamantri Chandru
Ashalatha
Shobharaj

Release
The film was released on 3 April 2002 across Karnataka state cinema halls. The film was met with positive response at the box office. Producer K. Manju claimed that Jamindarru was his costliest movie at the time of release.

Soundtrack
All the songs are composed and scored by M. M. Keeravani.

References

2002 films
2000s Kannada-language films
Indian action drama films
Films scored by M. M. Keeravani
2002 action drama films
Films directed by S. Narayan